William Franklin "Red" Hamilton (August 11, 1883 – August 1, 1955) was an American sprinter who competed at the 1908 Summer Olympics in London.

Hamilton was a member of the 1600 m medley relay team that won the gold medal. He ran the first leg of 200 meters and was followed by Nate Cartmell (200 m), John Taylor (400 m) and Mel Sheppard (800 m). Hamilton gave the team a six-yard lead over the nearest competitor, running a split time of 22.0 seconds. Hamilton also competed in the 100 m and the 200 m events. He won the first-round heat of the 100 m in a time of 11.2 seconds, but did not start the second round. In the 200 m, he was eliminated in the semifinal.

References

Further reading
 
 
 

1883 births
1955 deaths
People from Marshall County, Iowa
Track and field athletes from Iowa
American male sprinters
Athletes (track and field) at the 1908 Summer Olympics
Olympic gold medalists for the United States in track and field
Medalists at the 1908 Summer Olympics
USA Outdoor Track and Field Championships winners